An inventory revolving line of credit is a form of an asset based loan that is specifically collateralized by inventory held for sale. Rather than amortizing the principal amount over time, revolving lines of credit (revolvers) solely accrue interest on the outstanding balance and is charged in arrears. As long as inventory is replenished, the borrower can redraw upon their line of credit to up to their borrowing base availability determined by the facilities advance rate. Advance rates are typically 20% to 65% of inventory at cost, and may be capped by Net Orderly Liquidation Values.

Usage
This type of loan is typically used by E-commerce as well as Brick and Mortar retailers who need to maintain high levels of inventory in order to meet immediate order fulfillment expectations. Because these companies continue to maintain high inventory levels throughout their lifecycle and inventory levels can experience brief or sometimes seasonal fluctuations, revolving lines of credit are a common financing solution. Inventory revolving lines of credit are most typically used to keep vendor payments current and replenish inventory as it is sold. While many small companies may use Merchant Cash Advances to obtain supplementary working capital, these become very costly as a company scales and amortize quickly. Companies with high levels of inventory often used asset secured loans instead as a stepping stone to obtain an unsecured bank financed line of credit.

References

Credit
Personal finance